Geoff Gray (born 27 August 1943) is an Australian cricketer. He played in six first-class matches for Queensland between 1968 and 1970.

See also
 List of Queensland first-class cricketers

References

External links
 

1943 births
Living people
Australian cricketers
Queensland cricketers
Cricketers from Brisbane